Boxing at the 1974 Asian Games was held in Mohammad Reza Shah Stadium, Tehran, Iran between 5 and 14 September 1974.

Medalists

Medal table

Participating nations
A total of 90 athletes from 14 nations competed in boxing at the 1974 Asian Games:

Results

48 kg

51 kg

54 kg

57 kg

60 kg

63.5 kg

67 kg

71 kg

75 kg

81 kg

+81 kg

References 

 New Straits Times, September 7–16, 1974
 The Straits Times, September 7–16, 1974

External links
Medals

 
1974 Asian Games events
1974
Asian Games
1974 Asian Games